The Naturals is a series of young adult novels by Jennifer Lynn Barnes. Beginning with 2013's initial novel of the same name, the series follows the life of Cassie Hobbes, a 17-year-old girl who is contacted by the FBI to join a special program.

The initial book was followed by Killer Instinct, published in 2014. The third book, All In, came out in 2015, and the fourth and final book, Bad Blood, was published in 2016. A novella, titled Twelve, was published in 2017.

Books

Reception
Alex Winters of The State Journal-Register praised the series and said, "If you enjoy suspenseful crime thrillers and whodunnits with a dash of teen melodrama, then this is the book series for you." The New York Times best-selling author Ally Carter said the series was "a must-read for anyone who likes books about real teens who have no superpowers and yet aren’t quite typical either." Reviewing the first novel, Kirkus Reviews wrote:

Also reviewing the first novel, Publishers Weekly lauded the writing by Jennifer Lynn Barnes, stating that "Barnes shows every card at just the right moment, catching readers off-guard at the final reveal. It’s a stay-up-late-to-finish kind of book, and it doesn’t disappoint."

Kristi Elle Jemtegaard, from Booklist, wrote in her review for the initial book that "Nevertheless, teens looking for a fast-paced heart-stopper may find the pace slow at first, but then the thrills and chills kick in—only to leave listeners hanging, as this is the initial volume of a projected series."

Accolades

References

External links

Book series introduced in 2013
American mystery novels
American romance novels
American young adult novels
Novels about serial killers
Novels about murder
Novels about the Federal Bureau of Investigation
Publications established in 2013
Novels set in Las Vegas